Leonowens is a surname. Notable people with the surname include:

 Anna Leonowens (1834–1915), Indian-British travel writer, educator, and social activist
 Louis T. Leonowens (1856–1919), Siamese cavalry officer and trader, son of Anna